Mast, MAST or MASt may refer to:

Engineering
 Mast (sailing), a vertical spar on a sailing ship
 Flagmast, a pole for flying a flag
 Guyed mast, a structure supported by guy-wires
 Mooring mast, a structure for docking an airship
 Radio masts and towers , towers that carry antennas
 The primary support for a helicopter rotor
 The main vertical structure of a forklift truck
 Multi-axis shaker table, an automotive test system
 Model for assessment of telemedicine, used to assess long-distance medical treatment

Biology
 Mast (botany), the edible parts of woody plants
 Mast Arboretum, at Stephen F. Austin State University in Nacogdoches, Texas
 Mast cell, involved in the allergy response
 Mast., in botanical naming, the standard author abbreviation for Maxwell T. Masters
 Two microtubule-associated serine/threonine-protein kinase enzymes:
 MAST1, an enzyme that in humans is encoded by the MAST1 gene
 MAST2, an enzyme that in humans is encoded by the MAST2 gene

Science
 Multi-Application Survivable Tether, an experimental space mission
 Multimission Archive at STScI, a component of the National Space Science Data Center
 Mega Ampere Spherical Tokamak, a nuclear fusion experiment in the UK
 Mikulski Archive for Space Telescopes in Maryland, USA

Society and culture
 Mast (hieroglyph), an Egyptian language triliteral
 Mast (naval) , in naval tradition, a non-judicial disciplinary hearing
 Mast (Sufism), in India, Pakistan, and Iran, a type of religious intoxication
 Mast (film), a 1999 Indian movie by Ram Gopal Verma
 Mast General Store, an American regional store chain

Places
 Mast-e Olya, a village in Markazi Province, Iran
 Mast-e Sofla, a village in Markazi Province, Iran

Organizations
 Maritime Archaeology Sea Trust, a UK-based charity
 Masters And slaves Together (MAsT), an international BDSM organization
 Municipal Ambulance Services Trust, an EMS provider in Kansas City, Missouri

Schools and education
 Marine Academy of Science and Technology, a school in Sandy Hook, New Jersey
 MAST Academy (Maritime and Science Technology Academy), a school in Miami, Florida
 MAST Academy @ Homestead Medical Magnet, a school in Homestead, Florida
 José Martí MAST 6-12 Academy, a school in Hialeah, Florida
 Master of Advanced Studies (MASt), a degree offered by some universities

Other uses
 Mast (surname), a surname
 Mast (musician), American jazz artist
 Yogurt in Persian and Kurdish
 Michigan Alcohol Screening Test, a test for alcoholism
 Military anti-shock trousers, a medical device